The caravel (Portuguese:) is a small maneuverable sailing ship used in the 15th century by the Portuguese to explore along the West African coast and into the Atlantic Ocean. The lateen sails gave it speed and the capacity for sailing windward (beating). Caravels were used by the Portuguese and Castilians for the oceanic exploration voyages during the 15th and 16th centuries, during the Age of Discovery.

Etymology

History 

The earliest caravels originated in the thirteenth century on the coasts of Galicia and Portugal. They may well have been derived from similar Muslim craft that were used elsewhere in the Iberian Peninsula. These early caravels were used for offshore fishing and some coastal cargo carrying. They were small, lightly-built vesselsperhaps of 20 tons or less, carrying, in one regional example, a crew of 5 men. They carried a single-masted lateen rig. There is mention, in 1307, of larger caravels (up to 30 tons) in Biscaya size that can be regarded as a ship, rather than a boat. Caravels were clearly a common type in Iberia for most of the 15th century.

The caravel became the preferred vessel for Portuguese explorers like Diogo Cão, Bartolomeu Dias or Gaspar and Miguel Corte-Real, and by Christopher Columbus. They were agile and easier to navigate than the barca and barinel, with a tonnage of 50 to 160 tons and 1 to 3 masts, with lateen triangular sails. Being smaller and having a shallow keel, the caravel could sail upriver in shallow coastal waters. With the lateen sails attached, it was highly maneuverable and could sail much nearer to the shore, while with the square Atlantic-type sails attached, it was very fast. Its economy, speed, agility, and power made it esteemed as the best sailing vessel of its time. The limited capacity for cargo and crew were their main drawbacks, but did not hinder its success.

The exploration done with caravels made the spice trade of the Portuguese and the Spanish possible. However, for the trade itself, the caravel was later replaced by the larger carrack (nau), which was more profitable for trading. The caravel was one of the pinnacle ships in Iberian ship development from 1400–1600.

Design 
Due to its lighter weight and thus greater speed, the caravel was a boon to sailors.
Early caravels generally carried two or three masts with lateen sails, while later types had four masts. It was in such ships that Christopher Columbus set out on his expedition in 1492; Santa María was a nau of about 100 tons which served as the flagship and the Pinta and Niña were smaller caravels of around 15–20 m with a beam of 6 m and displacing around 60–75 tons.

Square-rigged caravel

Towards the end of the 15th century, the Portuguese developed a larger version of the caravel, bearing a forecastle and sterncastle – though not as high as those of a carrack, which would have made it unweatherly – but most distinguishable for its square-rigged foremast, and three other masts bearing lateen rig. In this form it was referred to in Portuguese as a "round caravel" (caravela redonda) as in Iberian tradition, a bulging square sail is said to be round.

It was employed in coast-guard fleets near the Strait of Gibraltar and as an armed escort for merchant ships between Portugal and Brazil and in the Cape Route. Some consider this a forerunner of the fighting galleon and it remained in use until the 17th century.

See also
 Iberian ship development, 1400–1600
 Notorious - a replica caravel in Australia
 Portuguese India Armadas
Carrack, a type of round ship used in voyage to East India
Lateen sail
Square rig
Portuguese man o' war

References

External links

The History and Development of Caravels - A Thesis - George Robert Schwarz, B.A., University of Cincinnati, Chair of Advisory Committee: Dr. Luis Filipe Vieira de Castro,  May 2008
 Museu da Marinha 
 Museu da Marinha, fac-similes, 
 Instituto Camões. Caravela
 Durchbruch am Kap des Schreckens dir. Axel Engstfeld, Germany 2002, 52m. ZDF 

Sailing ship types
Exploration ships
Maritime history of Portugal
Portuguese inventions
Age of Sail